Macgraff David E. Leuluai (born 9 February 1990) is a rugby league footballer who plays as a  or .

Background
He was born in Wakefield, West Yorkshire, England.

His father, James, and his brother, Thomas, have both represented New Zealand and he is part of a wider Leuluai family that includes Phillip and Kyle.

Playing career
Born in Wakefield while his father was playing for Wakefield Trinity, Leuluai was a Newcastle Knights junior before joining Leigh Centurions as an 18-year-old in 2009. As he was born in Wakefield, Leuluai does not require a work permit to play in England and does not count on the overseas quota.

Leuluai joined Widnes in 2011 on a one-year contract. This was later extended to a Super League deal ending in 2013.

On 19 August 2020 it was announced that Leuluai would leave Widnes at the end of the 2020 season

References

External links
Widnes Vikings profile
SL profile

1990 births
Living people
Leigh Leopards players
Macgraff
New Zealand rugby league players
New Zealand expatriate sportspeople in England
English people of New Zealand descent
North Wales Crusaders players
Rugby league players from Wakefield
Rugby league props
Rugby league second-rows
Whitehaven R.L.F.C. players
Widnes Vikings players
Workington Town players